Sir George Alfred Wills, 1st Baronet of Blagdon (3 June 1854 – 11 July 1928) was a President of Imperial Tobacco and the head of an eminent Bristol family.

He was the son of Henry Overton Wills III and Alice Hopkinson and was educated at Mill Hill School before joining his father’s business; he eventually became the managing director. He was responsible for the giving of £110,000 and £25,000 for the creation of a hall of residence for Bristol University students.

Many of the boarding houses at Mill Hill School are located on Wills Grove, named after George Alfred Wills.

George Alfred Wills was created a Baronet in 1923 Birthday Honours.

He was responsible, with his brother Henry Herbert Wills,  for the building of the Wills Memorial Building in memory of his father Henry Overton Wills III. Another brother was Walter Melville Wills, who was also involved with the family tobacco business.(WD & HO Wills)

Wills was a nephew of Sir Edward Payson Wills Bt, Sir Frederick Wills Bt, & Sir Frank William Wills Kt, and also a cousin of Gilbert Wills, 1st Baron Dulverton, & Sir Ernest Wills, 3rd Baronet of Hazelwood.

Seats - Combe Lodge, Blagdon, Somerset, & Burwalls, Leigh Woods, Long Ashton, Somerset.

References

External links
George Wills obituary
Genealogy

1854 births
1928 deaths
People educated at Mill Hill School
People associated with the University of Bristol
Baronets in the Baronetage of the United Kingdom
George Alfred